The Swan School is a coeducational secondary school and sixth form located in Marston, Oxford.   The school opened in September 2019 and was Oxford's first new secondary school in more than 50 years.  The Swan is part of the River Learning Trust which also includes nearby Cherwell School.

The school has a capacity of 1,260 pupils.  Admissions first started with an intake of 120 students in September 2019, into temporary accommodation.  New premises were constructed on Marston Ferry Road and the school moved in September 2020.  The school has a teaching complement of 15.

References

Secondary schools in Oxfordshire
Free schools in England
Educational institutions established in 2019
Schools in Oxford
2019 establishments in England